The 2007 season of the Toppserien, the highest women's football (soccer) league in Norway, began on 21 April 2007 and ended on 3 November 2007.

22 games were played with 3 points given for wins and 1 for draws. Number eleven and twelve were relegated, while the two top teams from the First Division were promoted.

Røa won the league, three points ahead of reigning champion Kolbotn.

League table

Top goalscorers
 22 goals:
  Melissa Wiik, Asker
 14 goals:
  Ragnhild Gulbrandsen, Asker
  Solveig Gulbrandsen, Kolbotn
 12 goals:
  Kristin Blystad Bjerke, Kolbotn
 11 goals:
  Madeleine Giske, Arna-Bjørnar
  Rebecca Angus, Kolbotn
  Lene Mykjåland, Røa
  Kristin Lie, Trondheims-Ørn
 10 goals:
  Kristy Moore, Fløya
 9 goals:
  Guro Knutsen, Røa
  Ida Elise Enget, Team Strømmen
  Lene Storløkken, Team Strømmen

Promotion and relegation
 Sandviken and Grand Bodø were relegated to the First Division.
 Larvik and Fart were promoted from the First Division.

References
League table
Fixtures
Goalscorers

Toppserien seasons
Top level Norwegian women's football league seasons
1
Nor
Nor